Alan Gill (born 5 August 1940 in Underwood, Nottinghamshire) is an English former first-class cricketer active 1960–65 who played for Nottinghamshire.

References

1940 births
English cricketers
Nottinghamshire cricketers
Living people
People from Underwood, Nottinghamshire
Cricketers from Nottinghamshire